Albert Monks (1903–1937) was an English footballer who played as a goalkeeper for Rochdale. He also played non-league football for various other clubs.

References

Rochdale A.F.C. players
Manchester City F.C. players
Prescot Cables F.C. players
Stalybridge Celtic F.C. players
Stalybridge Rovers F.C. players
Sportspeople from Prestwich
English footballers
Association football goalkeepers
1903 births
1937 deaths